Inox may refer to:

 Stainless steel is known as inox in French and some other languages
 INOX Leisure Limited, an Indian cinema company

See also
 Nox (disambiguation)